Geophilus sounkyoensis is a species of soil centipede in the family Geophilidae found in Japan. Its body is yellow in color and it grows up to 40 millimeters in length; the males have about 55 leg pairs, the females 57.

References

sounkyoensis
Animals described in 1937

Arthropods of Japan